William Fitzwilliam, 1st Earl Fitzwilliam MP (29 April 1643 – 28 December 1719) was an English nobleman, Whig politician, and peer.

Fitzwilliam was the son of William FitzWilliam, 2nd Baron FitzWilliam and Jane Perry. On 21 February 1658, he succeeded to his father's title. As his title was in the Peerage of Ireland, Fitzwilliam was able to sit in the House of Commons of England, and served as the Member of Parliament for Peterborough from 1667 to 1679. He sat again for the seat in 1681. On 21 July 1716, he was made Viscount Milton and Earl Fitzwilliam, both titles in the Peerage of Ireland.

On 10 May 1669, he married Anne Cremor, daughter and sole heiress of Edmund Cremor and Anne Tryce. He was succeeded in his titles by his eldest son, John Fitzwilliam.

References

1643 births
1719 deaths
English MPs 1661–1679
English MPs 1681
Whig (British political party) MPs
Earls Fitzwilliam